Nikolai Semenovich Tikhonov (– 8 February 1979) was a Soviet writer and member of the Serapion Brothers literary group.

Biography

Born of parents who were petty tradesmen of serf descent, Tikhonov trained as a clerk, graduating from the Petersburg School of Commerce in 1911. He volunteered for the Imperial Russian Army at the outbreak of World War I and served in a hussar regiment; he entered the Red Army in 1918, fought in the Russian Civil War, and was demobilized in 1922. He began writing poetry early; his first collection, Orda (The Horde, 1922), "shows startling maturity" and "contains most of the few short poems which have made him famous." After 1922 he devoted himself to traveling and writing, and his later work, both verse (the collection Ten' druga, or The Shadow of a Friend, 1936) and prose (many adventure stories and the novel Voina, or War, 1931) reflects his delight in what he found in his travels, particularly in Georgia. His cycle of war stories Voennye koni (Military Horses, 1927) is "perceptive and well constructed."

He served on the Finnish front in the Winter War and was in Leningrad for the Siege. In 1944 he became chair of the Union of Soviet Writers, but was dismissed by Joseph Stalin in 1946 for being too tolerant of Zoshchenko and Akhmatova. However, he remained an important figure in Soviet literary circles, and he was awarded the Lenin Peace Prize in 1957.

Some of his well-known ballads are "Ballada o gvozdyakh" ("Ballad About Nails"), "Ballada o sinem pakete" ("Ballad of the Blue Parcel"), and "Dezertir" ("The Deserter").

Tikhonov was the first chairman of the Soviet Peace Committee, serving from 1949 to 1979.

References

External links
 Encyclopedia of Soviet Writers
 

1896 births
1979 deaths
Writers from Saint Petersburg
People from Sankt-Peterburgsky Uyezd
Soviet short story writers
20th-century short story writers
20th-century Russian poets
Soviet novelists
Russian military personnel of World War I
People of the Russian Civil War
Soviet military personnel of World War II
Heroes of Socialist Labour
Lenin Peace Prize recipients
Recipients of the Shevchenko National Prize
20th-century Russian translators
Soviet military personnel of the Russian Civil War